Vicente Madrigal National High School is a public high school in Binangonan, Rizal, Philippines. 

It was established in 1992 as Vicente Madrigal Municipal High School, but in the virtue of the Republic Act No. 8010 it was converted to a National High School on May 25, 1995. It was named after the late Senator Vicente Madrigal.
On 2012, the school has 2,800+ registered students. Absalon C. Fernandez is the Secondary School Principal II.

Facilities

The VMNHS has 9 two-storey buildings and 2 single-storey building. It includes a library, an Audio-Visual Room (AVR), Science Laboratory, School Clinic, Garments Laboratory, Home Economics Room and a School Cooperative. The school also includes a covered court, a gymnasium and two school canteens.

Class schedule

The class schedule for :
Junior High School is from 7:30 to 2:30 in the afternoon, Senior High School is from 7:30 to 6:00 pm.

Curricula

The school uses two curricula, the RBEC Curriculum (for RBEC students) and the K–12 curriculum (for the K–12 students), both using the zero-based grading system for each period.

K–12 program

The implementation of the K–12 program is "phased". The first phase of the implementation will start on SY 2012–2013. During this school year, universal kindergarten will be finally offered, and will now be a part of the compulsory education system; and a new curriculum for Grade 1 and Grade 7 students would be introduced. By SY 2016–2017, Grade 11/Year 5 will be introduced, and Grade 12/Year 6 by SY 2017–2018; with the phased implementation of the new curriculum finished by the SY 2017–2018. Students in 2nd year to 4th year high school this SY 2012–2013 are not included in the program. It is only applicable to students from Kinder to 1st year high school which is now called Grade 7.

Conversion into a National High School
By the virtue of the Republic Act No. 8010. Vicente Madrigal Municipal High School was converted into a National High School and lapsed into law on May 25, 1995.

 
 

Sec. 1.    The Vicente Madrigal Municipal High School is hereby converted into a National High School to be known as the Vicente Madrigal National High School.

Sec. 2.    The Secretary of the Department of Education Culture and Sports shall issue such rules and regulations as may be necessary to carry out the provisions of this Act.

Sec. 3.    The amount necessary to carry out the provisions of this Act shall be included in the General Appropriations Act of the year following its enactment into law and thereafter. 

Sec. 4.    This Act shall take effect upon its approval.

(Note:  Lapsed into law on May 25, 1995, without the signature of the President, in accordance with Article VI, Section 27 (1) of the Constitution.)

Gallery

See also
 Binangonan, Rizal
 Rizal
 Vicente Madrigal
 Guronasyon Foundation National High School

References

High schools in Rizal
Binangonan, Rizal